Frank Sholl Scott (9 January 1886 – ) was an Australian-born English rugby union player and medical practitioner. A son, E. K. (Edward) Scott, represented England in both rugby and cricket.

A winger, Frank Sholl Scott was selected for the English rugby team while playing for Bristol RFC in 1906.  His sole game for  England was against Wales, at Swansea, on 12 January 1907.

Born in Perth, Western Australia,  Scott was the son of Penelope Fanny Scott, née Sholl and Edward Scott, an English-born medical practitioner and member of the Western Australian Parliament. Penelope Scott was a member of a family prominent in Western Australia including her father, R. J. Sholl (a Government Resident) and brothers: Horace Sholl, R.F. Sholl (both entrepreneurs and politicians), Richard Sholl (postmaster-general), and Trevarton Sholl (an explorer).

Frank Sholl Scott attended Epsom College (1894–1901), before studying medicine at University College London and Bristol University.

In 1909–11, Scott practised as a doctor  at Goomalling, Western Australia and was an Honorary Magistrate (a term used at the time for Justices of the Peace). He returned to England and later lived and practised medicine at Truro, Cornwall.

During the First World War, Frank Sholl Scott served in the Royal Army Medical Corps, with the rank of Lieutenant.

Footnotes

Bibliography
 ESPN (no date), Frank Scott ENGLAND
 The Northam Advertiser (newspaper; Western Australia)
 Alan Scadding, 2014, Index of Old Epsomian Biographies between 1890 and 1914; Doctors: GPs, Consultants and the Most Eminent (Available from: Epsom College website.)
  War Office (no date), card of Scott, Frank Sholl (National Archives, ref. WO 372/17/197681.)

1886 births
1952 deaths
20th-century British medical doctors
Alumni of the University of Bristol
Alumni of University College London
Australian expatriate rugby union players
British Army personnel of World War I
Cornish rugby union players
England international rugby union players
English people of Australian descent
English rugby union players
Expatriate rugby union players in England
People educated at Epsom College
Rugby union players from Perth, Western Australia
Royal Army Medical Corps officers
Australian expatriates in the United Kingdom